Pike Valley USD 426 is a public unified school district headquartered in Scandia, Kansas, United States.  The district includes the communities of Scandia, Courtland, Kackley, Norway, Rydal, Sherdahl, and nearby rural areas.

Schools
The school district operates the following schools:
 Pike Valley Jr High/High School (7-12) - 100 School St in Scandia
 Pike Valley Elementary School (K-6) - 502 Grant St in Courtland

See also
 Kansas State Department of Education
 Kansas State High School Activities Association
 List of high schools in Kansas
 List of unified school districts in Kansas

References

External links
 

School districts in Kansas